The Lévézou is a geographical region in the Aveyron department in southern France. It is an impervious crystalline plateau with an average altitude of around 900m. Its highest point is Mont Seigne (1 128 m). Though its borders are not strictly defined, it is bounded in the south and east by the River Tarn and to the north by the Viaur. To the west it merges into the Ségala.

Etymology

Lévézou is the French form of the Occitan word Leveson- which derives from the root words eve (waters) and on (source of) so literally means the source of waters. From this location, the noble family the  Lévézou de Vezins derived their name. Their coat of arms has been adopted as a symbol for the region.

Geography

Topography

Geology

Communication

Communes within the Lévézou 

 - - = historic and rural Lévézou 
 - * - = communes around Rodez
 - ** - = communes shared with Ségala
 - *** - = communes between Lévézou and the Raspes du Tarn or la Muse

Hydroelectric generation 
The Tarn was dammed at Pinet and Jourdanie in 1929, and a third dam was added at Le Truel in 1959, and these were all used for run of the river power stations.

Between 1948 and 1952, the major rivers on the plateau were dammed; and by means of pumping stations and pipelines their waters were directed through the new reservoir at Villefranche-de-Panat where it dropped down to massive turbines at Le Pouget.

 Lac de Pont-de-Salars, sur le Viaur ;
 Lac de Bage, sur le Bage ;
 Lac de Pareloup sur le Vioulou ;
 Lac de Villefranche-de-Panat on the Alrance ;
 Lac de Saint-Amans
 barrage du Céor at Arvieu ;

Wind farms

The Lévézou has embraced wind energy and by April 2009 the following wind farms were in place:
 6 Wind turbines at Viarouge de Ségur ;
 29 Wind turbines at Salles-Curan ;
 6 Wind turbines at Canet-de-Salars ;
 13 Wind turbines at Castelnau-Pégayrols ;
 5 Wind turbines at Lestrade-et-Thouels ;
 8 Wind turbines at Ayssènes.

Rural economy

References
Material taken from :fr:Lévézou

Landforms of Aveyron
Plateaus of Metropolitan France